Works Applications Co., Ltd. is an ERP system manufacturer in Japan, headquartered in Tokyo, Minato-ku. It has business in the development, sales and support package system. Its product AI Works is a cloud-based ERP system based on machine learning technologies (AI) to automate tasks and improve processes.

Overview

Works Applications was founded on July 24, 1996, and is headquartered in Tokyo, Minato-ku, Japan. According to Bloomberg, the company is the "biggest Japanese vendor of business software for payroll and human resources" in 2015. Its customers include government agencies, major trading companies, manufacturers and other big companies from Japan and outside Japan. According to the company, it had more than 7,000 customers as of 2016.

Its product AI Works operates by offering every employee a personal assistant. AI Works studies and analyzes operational log data generated from daily operations and makes predictions based on the task at hand and user’s position.

History

1996  
July - establishment
September - "COMPANY" HR Series officially launched
2001  
April - "COMPANY Web Service" officially launched
December - JASDAQ (OTC) market listing
2002  
September - "COMPANY Assignment & Project Management" officially launched
2003  
April - "COMPANY Knowledge Information Portal" officially launched 
May - HR product accounts for largest market share in Japan 
2004  
May - "COMPANY" AC series officially shipped 
June - "COMPANY Learning Management" officially launched
2008  
Established a technology research department by the name of Advanced Technology & Engineering Division (ATE)
2009  
April - "COMPANY" SCM series officially shipped
2010  
May - "COMPANY" EC series officially shipped 
2014  
February - industry, academia and government joint research project / COMPANY Innovation Academy "Economic analysis of companies in the human resources allocation mechanism" announced 
October - AI-based ERP system announced by the name of AI Works
November - "LaKeel Messenger" by Works Applications officially shipped 
2015  
India based IVTL (Infoview Technologies Pvt Ltd) consolidated with Works Applications
My number management platform "My Number Keeping System Powered by Works Applications (MKS)" provided free of charge announcement 
2016  
July  - Subsidiary, Ariel Networks, Inc., consolidated with Works Applications
2017
February  - Established "WAP Tokushima Laboratory of AI and NLP"
February  - Ranked first in the Best Workplaces 2017 Survey in Japan and received "Best Company" award for 10 consecutive year
April  - Received “Best Company” award for 3 consecutive years from "Best Workplaces in Asia"

Awards and rankings
 "Think Big AWS Leadership Award", by Amazon Web Service in 2014
"Good Design Award" for AI Works, by the Japan Institute of Design Promotion in 2015
Ranked "Best Workplace in Asia" by the Great Place to Work Institute in 2017

See also
Enterprise resource planning

References

External links

ERP software companies
Japanese brands
Software companies of Japan
Telecommunications companies of Japan